Dong Xiaoqin (born 2 January 1983 in Lintao County, Dingxi, Gansu) is a Chinese long-distance runner who specializes in the 10,000 metres.

She finished twenty-eighth in the 10,000 metres at the Olympic Games.

Personal bests
5000 metres - 15:33.95 min (2007)
10,000 metres - 31:31.87 min (2008)
Marathon - 2:39:43 hrs (2008)

References
 
 Team China 2008

1983 births
Living people
Athletes (track and field) at the 2008 Summer Olympics
Chinese female long-distance runners
Olympic athletes of China
People from Dingxi
Runners from Gansu